Eleutherodactylus juanariveroi, the Puerto Rican wetland frog or ,  is an endangered species of coqui, a frog species, endemic to Puerto Rico. It was discovered in 2005 by Neftalí Rios, and was named after Puerto Rican herpetologist Juan A. Rivero, in honor of his contributions to Puerto Rican herpetology.

Distribution
It is only found in the old Naval Base of Sábana Seca in Toa Baja, Puerto Rico.

Description
It is characterized by a high-frequency, chip-like sound, a light-brown skin color, and a strip between the eyes. It is the smallest species of coqui.

Conservation
The Department of Natural Resources of Puerto Rico added this species to the endangered species list, and designated its critical habitat likewise. However, the protection was removed by the Puerto Rico Supreme Court on 12 June 2012. The species is listed as endangered under the Endangered Species Act.

References

External links

http://www.coquipr.com/coquies/coquillanero.php 

juanariveroi
Critically endangered fauna of North America
Endemic fauna of Puerto Rico
Amphibians of Puerto Rico
Frogs of North America
Amphibians described in 2007
Taxa named by Richard Thomas (herpetologist)
ESA endangered species